This is a list of 162 species in Atomaria, a genus of silken fungus beetles in the family Cryptophagidae.

Atomaria species

 Atomaria abietina Reitter, 1887 g
 Atomaria affinis (F.Sahlberg, 1834) g
 Atomaria aleutica Casey, 1900 i c g
 Atomaria alpina Heer, 1841 g
 Atomaria alternans (Wollaston, 1854) g
 Atomaria analis Erichson, 1846 g
 Atomaria apicalis Erichson, 1846 i c g b
 Atomaria atra (Herbst, 1793) g
 Atomaria atrata Reitter, 1875 g b
 Atomaria atricapilla Stephens, 1830 g
 Atomaria attila Reitter, 1878 g
 Atomaria badia Erichson, 1846 g
 Atomaria barani Brisout de Barneville, 1863 g
 Atomaria basalis Erichson, 1846 g
 Atomaria basicornis Reitter, 1888 g
 Atomaria bella Reitter, 1875 g
 Atomaria bescidica Reitter, 1887 g
 Atomaria bicolor Erichson, 1846 g
 Atomaria brevicollis Casey, 1900 i c g
 Atomaria bulbosa Wollaston, 1865 g
 Atomaria capitata (Casey, 1900) i c g
 Atomaria carinula (Casey, 1900) i c g
 Atomaria carpathica Reitter, 1875 g
 Atomaria caseyi Grouvelle, 1916 i c g
 Atomaria castanea (Casey, 1900) i c g
 Atomaria clavigera Ganglbauer, 1899 g
 Atomaria coloradensis (Casey, 1900) i c g
 Atomaria constricta (Casey, 1900) i c g
 Atomaria crassula (Casey, 1900) i c g
 Atomaria cribella Reitter, 1887 g
 Atomaria cribripennis (Casey, 1900) i c g
 Atomaria crypta Casey, 1900 i c g
 Atomaria delicatula Tournier, 1872 g
 Atomaria deubeli Holdhaus, 1903 g
 Atomaria diluta Erichson, 1846 i c g
 Atomaria dispersa (Casey, 1900) i c g
 Atomaria distincta Casey, 1900 i c g b
 Atomaria ebenina Casey, 1924 i c g
 Atomaria elongatula Erichson, 1846 g
 Atomaria ephippiata Zimmermann, 1869 i c g b
 Atomaria fallax Casey, 1900 i c g
 Atomaria fasciata Kolenati, 1846 g
 Atomaria fimetarii (Fabricius, 1792) g
 Atomaria fimetarius (Fabricius, 1792) g
 Atomaria forticornis (Casey, 1900) i c g
 Atomaria fulvipennis Mannerheim, 1846 i c g
 Atomaria fuscata (Schönherr, 1808) i c g b
 Atomaria fuscipes (Gyllenhal) g
 Atomaria gibbula Erichson, 1846 g
 Atomaria gilvipennis Casey, 1900 i c g
 Atomaria godarti Guillebeau, 1885 g
 Atomaria gonodera Casey, 1900 i c g
 Atomaria gottwaldi Johnson, 1971 g
 Atomaria gracilicornis Reitter, 1887 g
 Atomaria grandicollis C.Brisout de Barneville, 1882 g
 Atomaria gravidula Erichson, 1846 g
 Atomaria grossepunctata Reitter, 1896 g
 Atomaria gutta Newman, 1834 g
 Atomaria hislopi Wollaston, 1857 g
 Atomaria ihsseni Johnson, 1978 g
 Atomaria impressa Erichson, 1846 g b
 Atomaria incerta Casey, 1900 i c g
 Atomaria inepta Casey, 1900 i c g
 Atomaria insecta Wollaston, 1857 g
 Atomaria jonica Reitter, 1888 g
 Atomaria kamtschatica Motschulsky, 1845 i c g
 Atomaria laetula LeConte, 1857 i c g
 Atomaria laevis Reitter, 1884 g
 Atomaria lapponica Johnson, 1978 g
 Atomaria laticollis Wollaston, 1865 g
 Atomaria lederi Johnson, 1970 i c g b
 Atomaria lepidula Mäklin, 1852 i c g
 Atomaria lewisi Reitter, 1877 i c g b
 Atomaria linearis Stephens, 1836 i c g
 Atomaria lineola (Notman, 1920) i c g
 Atomaria lohsei Johnson & Strand, 1968 g
 Atomaria longicornis Thomson, 1863 g
 Atomaria longipennis (Casey, 1900) i c g
 Atomaria lucens Grouvelle, 1916 i c g
 Atomaria luculenta (Casey, 1900) i c g
 Atomaria lundbergi Johnson, 1978 g
 Atomaria macer (Casey, 1900) i c g
 Atomaria marginicollis Reitter, 1887 g
 Atomaria melanica Hatch, 1962 i c g
 Atomaria melas (Casey, 1900) i c g
 Atomaria mesomela Herbst, 1792 g b
 Atomaria mesomelas (Herbst, 1792) i c g
 Atomaria mongolica Johnson, 1970 g
 Atomaria montenegrina Reitter, 1887 g
 Atomaria morio Kolenati, 1846 g
 Atomaria munda Erichson, 1846 g
 Atomaria nanula Casey, 1900 i c g
 Atomaria nebulosa Casey, 1924 i c g
 Atomaria nigricollis (Casey, 1900) i c g
 Atomaria nigripennis (Kugelann, 1794) g
 Atomaria nigrirostris Stephens, 1830 i c g b
 Atomaria nigriventris Stephens, 1830 i c g
 Atomaria nitidula (Marsham, 1802) g
 Atomaria nubipennis Casey, 1900 i c g
 Atomaria obliqua Johnson, 1971 g
 Atomaria oblongula Casey, 1900 i c g
 Atomaria ochronitens (Casey, 1900) i c g
 Atomaria ornata Heer, 1841 g
 Atomaria oromii Israelson, 1985 g
 Atomaria pallidipennis Holdhaus, 1903 g
 Atomaria palmi Johnson, 1975 g
 Atomaria parva Schenkling, 1923 i c g
 Atomaria parviceps Notman, 1921 i c g
 Atomaria parvula Reitter, 1875 g
 Atomaria patens (Casey, 1900) i c g
 Atomaria peltata Kraatz, 1853 g
 Atomaria peltataeformis Sjöberg, 1947 g
 Atomaria planulata (Mäklin, 1853) i c g
 Atomaria plicata Reitter, 1875 g
 Atomaria postpallens Casey, 1900 i c g
 Atomaria pseudaffinis Johnson & Strand, 1968 g
 Atomaria pseudatra Reitter, 1887 g
 Atomaria pseudoaffinis Johnson & Strand, 1968 g
 Atomaria pudica Johnson, 1971 g
 Atomaria puella (Casey, 1900) i c g
 Atomaria pulchra Erichson, 1846 i c g
 Atomaria pumilio (Casey, 1900) i c g
 Atomaria puncticollis Thomson, 1868 g
 Atomaria punctithorax Reitter, 1887 g
 Atomaria pusilla (Paykull, 1798) i c g
 Atomaria quadricollis (Casey, 1900) i c g
 Atomaria rhenanonum Kraatz, 1853 g
 Atomaria rhenonum Kraatz, 1853 g
 Atomaria riparia Casey, 1900 i c g
 Atomaria rubella Heer, 1841 g
 Atomaria rubida Reitter, 1875 g
 Atomaria rubricollis Brisout de Barneville, 1863 g
 Atomaria scutellaris Motschulsky, 1849 g
 Atomaria semitestacea Reitter, 1887 g
 Atomaria semusta Johnson, 1969 g
 Atomaria slavonica C.Johnson, 1971 g
 Atomaria sodermani Sjöberg, 1947 g
 Atomaria soedermani Sjoberg, 1947 g
 Atomaria soror Ganglbauer, 1899 g
 Atomaria sparreschneideri Munster, 1927 g
 Atomaria sparsula Reitter, 1887 g
 Atomaria sparsutula Reitter, 1887 g
 Atomaria strandi Johnson, 1967 g
 Atomaria stricticollis (Casey, 1900) i c g b
 Atomaria subalutacea Casey, 1900 i c g
 Atomaria subangulata Sahlberg, 1926 g b
 Atomaria subdentata (Casey, 1900) i c g
 Atomaria subnitens (Casey, 1900) i c g
 Atomaria subrecta (Casey, 1900) i c g
 Atomaria tenebrosa (Casey, 1900) i c g
 Atomaria testacea Stephens, 1830 i c g b
 Atomaria torrida Johnson, 1971 g
 Atomaria turgida Erichson, 1846 g
 Atomaria umbrina (Gyllenhal, 1827) g
 Atomaria undulata (Casey, 1900) i c g
 Atomaria unifasciata Erichson, 1846 g
 Atomaria venusta Wollaston, 1865 g
 Atomaria versa Grouvelle, 1916 i c g
 Atomaria versicolor Erichson, 1846 g
 Atomaria vespertina Mäklin, 1853 i c g b
 Atomaria wollastoni Sharp, 1867 i c g b
 Atomaria zetterstedti (Zetterstedt, 1838) g

Data sources: i = ITIS, c = Catalogue of Life, g = GBIF, b = Bugguide.net

References

Atomaria
Articles created by Qbugbot